Reategui or Reátegui is a surname. Notable people with the surname include:

Anthony Reategui, American poker player
Javier Reátegui (born 1944), Peruvian politician
Rolando Reátegui (born 1959), Peruvian entrepreneur and politician